Baltic flood may refer to:

 The Zanclean flood that ended the Messinian salinity crisis 5.33 million years ago
 The All Saints' Flood of 1304
 The 1872 Baltic Sea flood
 Other storm floods in the Baltic Sea